Bathybela is a genus of sea snails, marine gastropod mollusks in the family Raphitomidae. It has four described species.

Species
Species within the genus Bathybela include:
 Bathybela nudator (Locard, 1897)
 Bathybela papyracea Waren & Bouchet, 2001
 Bathybela tenelluna (Locard, 1897)
Species brought in to synonymy
 Bathybela costlowi Petuch, 1974: synonym of Bathybela tenelluna (Locard, 1897)
 Bathybela oculifera Kantor, Yu.I. & A.V. Sysoev, 1986: synonym of Gymnobela oculifera Kantor, Yu.I. & A.V. Sysoev, 1986
 Bathybela tenellunum: synonym of Bathybela tenelluna (Locard, 1897)

References

External links
  Dall W.H. (1918). Notes on the nomenclature of the mollusks of the family Turritidae. Proceedings of the United States National Museum. 54: 313-333
  Bouchet, P.; Kantor, Y. I.; Sysoev, A.; Puillandre, N. (2011). A new operational classification of the Conoidea (Gastropoda). Journal of Molluscan Studies. 77(3): 273-308
 
 Worldwide Mollusc Species Data Base: Raphitomidae

 
Raphitomidae
Gastropod genera